Sporade is a Peruvian brand of sports drink owned by Ajegroup. Launched in 2004, it has successfully wrestled market share from Gatorade thanks to its lower price.

See also
 Kola Real

References

External links
  Official website of the Ajegroup

Sporade
Peruvian drinks
Food and drink introduced in 2004
Ajegroup brands